Sunday E. Tuoyo (1935 – 17 December 2022) was a Nigerian Brigadier General who served as the Military Governor of Ondo State (July 1978 – October 1979) during the military regime of General Olusegun Obasanjo.

Education
Tuoyo attended Hussey College Warri.

Personal life
Tuoyo was of Itsekiri origin.

His son-in-law was Emmanuel Uduaghan, elected governor of Delta State in April 2007.

He died on 17 December 2022, at the age of 87.

References

1938 births
2022 deaths
Itsekiri people
Governors of Ondo State
Nigerian generals
Hussey College Warri alumni